Wells Fargo Arena may refer to:

Wells Fargo Arena (Des Moines, Iowa), on the grounds of the Iowa Events Center 
Wells Fargo Arena (Tempe, Arizona), on the campus of Arizona State University
Wells Fargo Arena (Dothan, Alabama)

See also
 Wells Fargo Center (disambiguation)